Caridad is a municipality in the Honduran department of Valle.

It is located close to the Salvadoran border.

Demographics
At the time of the 2013 Honduras census, Caridad municipality had a population of 3,927. Of these, 99.95% were Mestizo, 0.03% Indigenous and 0.03% Black or Afro-Honduran.

References

Municipalities of the Valle Department